Khothian is a village in Union Council chakwal, of Chakwal District in the Punjab Province of Pakistan It is part of chakwal Tehsil.

References

This Khotian is in Basharat Union Council and the khotian that's mentioned in this link, they changed the name of town from khotian to seghal abad

Union councils of Chakwal District
Populated places in Chakwal District